Mikelanxhelo 'Michelangelo' Bardhi (born 8 January 1995 in Krujë) is an Albanian football player who most recently played for Iliria Fushë-Krujë in the Albanian First Division as a midfielder.

Honours
KF Laçi
 Albanian Cup (1): 2014–15

References

1995 births
Living people
People from Krujë
Association football midfielders
Albanian footballers
Albania youth international footballers
KS Iliria players
FK Partizani Tirana players
KF Laçi players
Kategoria e Parë players
Kategoria Superiore players